Diego Mella (born 1 February 1993) is an Italian footballer who plays as a forward for Varesina.

Career
In January 2012, Mella and Jacopo Galimberti moved from Internazionale to Parma in a co-ownership deal, both tagged for €500,000. Co-currently Yao Eloge Koffi joined Inter for €1 million in co-ownership, made the deal pure player swap. Mella spent half-season in Parma's reserve.

The following summer Mella moved to San Marino on a year-long loan deal. On 20 June 2013 Parma acquired Nwankwo outright from Inter for €100,000 and sent Galimberti and Mella back to Milan for €1.85 million in a two-year contract.

On 26 July 2013 Mella was signed by Pro Patria. On 15 July 2014 he was signed by Pro Piacenza.

Footnotes

References

External links
 Football.it profile 
 
 

Italian footballers
A.S.D. Victor San Marino players
Parma Calcio 1913 players
Inter Milan players
Footballers from Milan
1993 births
Living people
Association football forwards